William Harrison Courtney (born July 18, 1944 in Baltimore, Maryland, USA) is an American diplomat, having served as representative for the U.S. mostly in Eastern Europe.

He was appointed by President Bill Clinton as Senior Director for Russia, Ukraine and Eurasian affairs in 1997.  He had previously served as Ambassador to Georgia.  Prior to that, Courtney was Ambassador to Kazakhstan, and co-chair of the U.S. delegation on Safety, Security and Dismantlement of Nuclear Weapons, and head of the U.S. delegation, with rank of Ambassador, to the implementing commissions established by the Threshold Test Ban and Peaceful Nuclear Explosions Treaties. Earlier, he served in the Nuclear and Space Talks in Geneva and at the American Embassies in Moscow and Brasilia. He was an international affairs fellow at the Council of Foreign Relations and from 1972 to 1999 was a career Foreign Service Officer. He is a member of the Council, the American Academy of Diplomacy, and the board of directors of the World Affairs Council of Washington, DC.

Dr. Courtney graduated from West Virginia University (B.A., 1966) and Brown University (Ph.D., 1980). He is married and has two children.

References

External links

1944 births
Living people
Ambassadors of the United States to Georgia (country)
Ambassadors of the United States to Kazakhstan
Brown University alumni
United States Foreign Service personnel
West Virginia University alumni
The Moscow Times